William Cornelius (born 1898) was an English professional football player and manager.

Career 
Cornelius was born in Bevedere, Kent in 1898. He played football for Belvedere & District, before venturing to France in 1922 to join FC Sète. Cornelius was brought over to the country along with fellow countryman Arthur Parkes by Scottish coach Victor Gibson. With Sète, he played in the 1923 Coupe de France Final against Red Star Olympique. In the match, Cornelius scored the team's opening goal, however, the club was unable to overcome the 3–1 deficit and were defeated 4–2. After his stint with Sète, Cornelius joined Olympique Alès and served in a player-coach role.

References 

1898 births
Year of death missing
Footballers from Belvedere, London
English footballers
Association football forwards
Erith & Belvedere F.C. players
Olympique Alès players
FC Sète 34 players
English football managers